A drum is a musical instrument.

Drum, drums or The Drum may also refer to:

Drums and drum-shaped items
 Drum (communication), a communication device
 Drum (container), a type of cylindrical container
 Drum brake, an automotive braking system
 Drum magazine, a cylindrical container for ammunition
 Drum memory, an early form of computer memory used in the 1950s and 1960s
 Electronic drum, in which sound is generated by an electronic waveform generator or sampler instead of by acoustic vibration
 Talking drum, an hourglass-shaped drum from West Africa
 Drum, the photoreceptor in a laser printer
 Drum or tholobate, in architecture, the lower part of a dome or cupola in the shape of a cylinder or prism

Places

Great Britain
 Drum (Wales), a mountain in Wales
 Drum Castle, a castle in Aberdeenshire, Scotland
 Drum railway station, a closed station in Aberdeenshire
 Drum, Edinburgh a location
 Drum, Perth and Kinross, a location
 The Drum (Arts Centre) in Birmingham, England

Ireland
 Drum, County Armagh, a townland in County Armagh, Northern Ireland
 Drum, County Londonderry, a townland in County Londonderry, Northern Ireland
 Drum, County Monaghan
 Drum, County Roscommon, a village in the Republic of Ireland
 Drum Manor Forest Park, a forest close to the Sperrin Mountains and Lough Neagh, Northern Ireland
 Drum GAC, a Gaelic Athletic Association club based in Drum, County Londonderry, Northern Ireland

United States
 Drum, Missouri
 "The Drum", nickname of Frank Erwin Center, former home court of the University of Texas at Austin's basketball teams
 Camp Drum (disambiguation), three military bases in the US
 Fort Drum, originally named Camp Drum

Entertainment

Books and magazines
 Drum, the 1962 novel by Kyle Onstott
 DRUM!, an American drumming magazine
 Drummer, an American gay BDSM magazine
 Drum (American magazine), an American gay culture, humor, and beefcake magazine
 Drum (South African magazine), a South African magazine
 The Drum (novel), by A. E. W. Mason
 Drums (comics), a 2011 supernatural comic book limited series
 Fredric Drum, protagonist of the Fredric Drum series of novels by Norwegian author Gert Nygårdshaug
 Drums, the 1925 debut novel by James Boyd, set in the American Revolutionary War

Film and television
 The Drum (1934 film), a British film directed by Sinclair Hill
 The Drum (1938 film), released in the U.S. as Drums, a British film starring Sabu, Raymond Massey and Roger Livesey
 Drum (1976 film), a sequel to the 1975 film Mandingo
 "Drum", a 2002 television ident for BBC Two from the 'Personality' series
 Drum (2004 film), a film about a journalist of Drum magazine
 Drum (2016 film), an Iranian drama film set in Tehran
 The Drum (TV program), an Australian current affairs show, beginning 2010

Music
 Drum (album), the first release from band Hugo Largo
 Drum (EP), by Local H
 "Drum" (MØ song), 2016
 "Drum" (Noa Kirel song), 2019
 "The Drum", a Alan Walker track 2022
 The Drum (band), a British musical group
 The Drums, an American musical group
The Drums (album), their self-titled 2010 album
 "Drum", a song by Sugababes from The Lost Tapes
 "Drums", a song by Jesus Jones from Culture Vulture
 "Drums", an improvisational song performed by the percussionists of the rock group the Grateful Dead
 "Drums", a song by P-MODEL from One Pattern
 "Drums", a song by Johnny Cash from Bitter Tears: Ballads of the American Indian
 "The Drum", a 1971 hit song for Bobby Sherman
 "The Drum", a 1974 song by Slapp Happy from Slapp Happy

Other
 Drum (fish), any of several fish in the family Sciaenidae
 Drum (surname), including a list of people with the surname
 Drum (tobacco), a brand of tobacco, owned by parent company Imperial Tobacco
 Drum (yacht), a maxi yacht owned by Scottish car sales group Arnold Clark Automobiles
 Drum Islands, in the Canadian territory of Nunavut
 Dodge Revolutionary Union Movement, Detroit, Michigan-based labor and political organization
 DRUMS, a microsatellite designed and operated by Kawasaki Heavy Industries

See also 
 Cylinder, the shape of a drum and objects in contexts such as machinery sometimes referred to as drums
 Drum kit (or drum set or trap set), a collection of drums, cymbals, and other percussion instruments.
 Drumlin, an elongated hill
 Drum line (disambiguation)
 Drummer (disambiguation)
 Drumming (disambiguation)
 "Drumming Song" (2009 song), a 2009 song by Florence and the Machine
 Drum Song (1978 album), a 1985 album by drummer Philly Joe Jones
 Guci, a type of Chinese song, also known as a drum-song

es:Namek#Drum